Praskačka is a municipality and village in Hradec Králové District in the Hradec Králové Region of the Czech Republic. It has about 1,100 inhabitants.

Administrative parts
Villages of Krásnice, Sedlice, Vlčkovice and Žižkovec are administrative parts of Praskačka.

Geography
It lies in a flat agricultural landscape of the East Elbe Table.

History
The village was founded shourtly before 1465 and was owned by the monastery in Opatovice. The first written mention of Praskačka is from 1465, when King George of Poděbrady handed over the village to his sons.

Transport
The D11 motorway runs through the municipality. Its intersection with the D35 motorway is also located here.

Sport
The municipality is known for its greyhound racing track, which is the only one in the Czech Republic which meets the international standards.

Sights
The landmark of Praskačka is the Church of the Holy Trinity. It dates from 1848.

Notable people
Bohumil Kubišta (1884–1918), painter

References

External links

Villages in Hradec Králové District